The following is a discography of UK pop production house Xenomania, put together by songwriter and record producer Brian Higgins. Members of the Xenomania writing and production team include Nick Coler, Giselle Sommerville, Niara Scarlett, Miranda Cooper (who shares co-writing credits in nearly all Xenomania-written tracks), Lisa Cowling, Tim Powell, and Matt Gray. In the turn of the decade, the team also welcomed members Carla Marie Williams, Toby Scott, Timothy "Hight" Deal, Florrie, Luke Fitton and Ben Taylor and Sarah Thompson. Xenomania also have their own in-house DJ and remixer, Tony Lamezma. They did have a second, Gravitas, but there has been no commercially released Gravitas remixes since 2005, the last one of these a remix of "Wake Me Up" by Girls Aloud.

International singles and certifications

1990s

2000s

2010s

Full discography

1990s

 A  Original production; final version produced by Mark Taylor and Brian Rawling

2000s

 B  with Chicane, Ray Hedges, Mark Emmitt and Nigel Butler

2010s

References

External links
 The Xenomania discography

X
X
Pop music discographies